Mark Gurr (born February 18, 1966) is a retired tennis player from Zimbabwe, who represented his native country as a qualifier at the 1988 Summer Olympics in Seoul, South Korea. There he lost in the first round of the men's singles competition to Spain's Sergio Casal.  He lost in the second round of the men's doubles competition to Sweden's eventual bronze medalists Anders Järryd and Stefan Edberg, while partnering Philip Tuckniss.

Mark went to Oriel Boys High School in Harare together with Byron Black and Graig Rodgers, and played in the Davis Cup.

External links
 

1966 births
Living people
Sportspeople from Harare
Zimbabwean male tennis players
Tennis players at the 1988 Summer Olympics
Olympic tennis players of Zimbabwe
Place of birth missing (living people)
African Games medalists in tennis
African Games gold medalists for Zimbabwe
Competitors at the 1987 All-Africa Games